Kim Se-lin (born 3 April 2000) is a South Korean ice hockey player and member of the South Korean national ice hockey team,  playing in the Korean Women's Hockey League (KWHL) with the Suwon City Hall women's ice hockey team.

Playing career
Kim participated in the women's ice hockey tournament at the 2018 Winter Olympics as part of a unified team of 35 players drawn from both the North Korean and South Korean national teams.

References

External links
 
 

2000 births
Living people
Ice hockey players at the 2017 Asian Winter Games
Ice hockey players at the 2018 Winter Olympics
Olympic ice hockey players of South Korea
South Korean women's ice hockey defencemen
Winter Olympics competitors for Korea